The Lahij insurgency was a guerrilla war waged by tribesmen loyal to Abdrabbuh Mansur Hadi against the Houthis and Yemen Army units loyal to Ali Abdullah Saleh, who controlled most of the Lahij Governorate of Yemen.
In late July, Pro-Hadi forces had launched an offensive to recapture Al Anad Air Base and rest of Lahij Governorate. On 4 August, Pro-Hadi forces had retaken full control of the Lahij Governorate.

Background
On 24 March, heavy fighting erupted in the Lahij Governorate as Houthi forces advanced.

On the morning of 25 March, the Houthis seized Al Anad Air Base, which had recently been abandoned by United States of America US SOCOM troops. Soon after the Houthis also captured Al Houta, where they took the Defence Minister Mahmoud al-Subaihi, one of Hadi's top lieutenants, as a prisoner and transferred him to Sana'a. In addition, the Houthi-allied 33rd Armored Brigade captured the towns of Al-Habilain and Al-Malah. With this, the Houthis had gained control of the Lahij Province.

The insurgency

On 27 March, 15–20 Houthi fighters were killed in an ambush in the Wahat region. Two days later, a landmine explosion killed another 25 Houthi fighters, while they were heading to Aden to reinforce their troops fighting for the city.

On 6 April, Saudi-led coalition air-strikes hit the Al Anad Air Base and a military camp killing 10 fighters, while on 8 April, eight Houthis were killed in an ambush by tribal fighters in the Karsh region.

On 11 April, 18 Houthi fighters were killed in an ambush while heading to Aden. Two days later, a suspected Al-Qaeda in the Arabian Peninsula (AQAP) bombing left 15 pro-Houthi soldiers dead in Al Houta.

On 13 April, anti-Houthi fighters claimed to have killed 15 in an attack on a Houthi tank using machine guns and rocket-propelled grenades in Al Houta.

On 1 July, a Coalition air-strike reportedly killed 13 Houthi fighters.

On 3 August, Pro-Hadi Forces recaptured Al Anad Air Base from Houthi rebels after besieging the base for two weeks.

On 4 August, Pro-Hadi Forces recaptured the entire Lahij Province from Houthi and Pro-Saleh forces.

Aftermath
In October 2016, local media reports said that at least 40 Houthi fighters were killed or injured during clashes with the government forces in hilly regions bordering Taiz in Lahij. Five loyalists were killed while fighting the assault.

References

2015 in Yemen
Battles involving Yemen
Conflicts in 2015
Military history of Yemen
Yemeni Crisis (2011–present)
Yemeni Civil War (2014–present)
Lahij Governorate